Mount Hope is a historic home located near Ridgeway, Fairfield County, South Carolina.  It was built about 1836, and is a -story, vernacular weatherboarded building on a raised brick basement. It has a gable roof and three pedimented dormers. Also on the property are a frame smoke house (c. 1850) and a tenant house (c. 1875).  It was the home of Dr. John Peyre Thomas, a prominent physician and amateur scientist.

It was added to the National Register of Historic Places in 1984.

References

Houses on the National Register of Historic Places in South Carolina
Houses completed in 1836
Houses in Fairfield County, South Carolina
National Register of Historic Places in Fairfield County, South Carolina